In Sweden many trains run at . Train types which currently attain this speed include the X2 tilting trains for long distances, the Regina widebody trains, the X40 double-decker regional trains, the Arlanda Airport Express X3, the MTRX-trains, flixtrains and the Stadler KISS-inspired double-decker regional trains. The X2 runs between many cities in Sweden including Stockholm, Gothenburg, and Malmö. The Arlanda Express trains connect Stockholm and Stockholm-Arlanda Airport.

Current plans

Upgrades to existing lines
Hundreds of kilometers of track are ready for  operation, with the exception of signaling systems, catenary, and the trains themselves.

These plans have been delayed until further notice because a decision must be made regarding whether to build a new parallel super-high-speed railway or not. Other railways that will eventually allow  speeds (today ) are long sections of Stockholm–Gothenburg, Gothenburg–Malmö, and Trollhättan–Gothenburg. A new Kramfors–Umeå line, Botniabanan has been ready for  non-tilting trains since 2010, but train operators have not yet revealed plans for  trains on Botniabanan, or on any other  capable line. All these will be mixed passenger/freight railways.

Botniabanan has had this system in operation since 2010, allowing . (The ATC does in theory allow  but that would require reinstalling most track equipment and signals since ATC uses point based transmission, and higher speed means new points of transmission.

SJ have bought new trains (type X55, delivered 2010) that are prepared for  but limited to  until a later date.

For instance, Stockholm to Malmö service now is going for 4.5 hours, which is 30 minutes longer than previously, reaching an old level of year 1991.

New lines
There were plans for completely new high-speed railways Stockholm–Linköping–Jönköping–Borås–Gothenburg ("Götalandsbanan") and Jönköping–Helsingborg–Copenhagen ("Europabanan" for the Swedish part), since the existing railways are relatively congested, with mixed  passenger trains, slower regional trains and even slower cargo trains.

The Swedish Transport Administration (Trafikverket) started detailed planning and was in the process of deciding the best route between Gothenburg–Borås and Linköping–Södertälje (Ostlänken), however no specific dates have been determined for the start of construction on these lines. An informal proposal by Trafikverket is an operational track by 2025. There is political and (primarily) regional pressure to build these railways as soon as possible. Cost estimates are about 10 bn SEK for Gothenburg-Borås and 24 bn SEK for Linköping-Södertälje.

In 2018 Chinese corporations became interested in building of Stockholm-Oslo high-speed line. Trafikverket awarded American engineering firm Jacobs Engineering Group with the contract to consult on a proposed $24 billion high-speed rail network linking Stockholm with Gothenburg and Malmö.

In late 2022, the then newly elected Swedish government decided to completely abandon Sweden's high-speed rail project.

New trainsets 
In December 2021, SJ has announced that they are ordering 25 trainsets which are capable of going . They are expected to go into service in 2026, and will also be used for cross-border traffic with Denmark and Norway.

Future proposals
The Borås–Linköping line will be built some years later than the first parts of Götalandsbanan. It has less potential for regional rail (still around 400,000 people live near this part of Götalandsbanan), but is of course needed for long-distance trains. Between Södertälje and Stockholm the existing railway with  potential will be used.
A southern extension to these lines, through Jönköping–Helsingborg–Copenhagen is considered economically unfeasible for the time being. Danish politicians are not very enthusiastic either.

Cost estimates are roughly 30 billion SEK for Borås–Linköping and 30 billion SEK for Jönköping–Helsingborg. The cost of the Helsingborg–Copenhagen line with a tunnel is hard to estimate, but 30 billion SEK is possible here too.

Travel times

These are realistic travel times based on future plans and investigations.

See also 
High-speed rail in Europe

References